Smith v. United States, 508 U.S. 223 (1993), is a United States Supreme Court case that held that the exchange of a gun for drugs constituted "use" of the firearm for purposes of a federal statute imposing penalties for "use" of a firearm "during and in relation to" a drug trafficking crime.

In Watson v. United States, 128 S.Ct. 697 (2007) the court later decided that a transaction in the opposite direction does not violate the same statute (i.e., Smith holds that one "uses" a gun by giving it in exchange for drugs, but Watson holds that one does not "use" a gun by receiving it in exchange for drugs).

Statutory Context and Sentencing
The defendant exchanged a firearm for cocaine and was convicted of drug trafficking.  The prosecution claimed this triggered enhanced sentencing because of the "use" of the gun in the commission of a crime. The defendant stated using a firearm for barter was not covered by the statutory meaning of "use". The Supreme Court had found that in a subsection of the statute, firearms could be 'used' as objects of commerce rather than as weapons, implying that a similar understanding and interpretation of 'used' should apply to the disputed sentence.

See also
 List of United States Supreme Court cases, volume 508
 List of United States Supreme Court cases
 Lists of United States Supreme Court cases by volume
 List of United States Supreme Court cases by the Rehnquist Court

External links

References

United States Supreme Court cases
United States Supreme Court cases of the Rehnquist Court
1993 in United States case law
United States Supreme Court criminal cases
United States federal firearms case law
United States controlled substances case law